Clearing Weather is a children's historical novel by Cornelia Meigs. Opening in a coastal Massachusetts town shortly after the American Revolution, it follows the circumstances of the building of a great sailing ship, the Jocasta, and its first voyage to the Caribbean. The novel, illustrated by Frank Dobias, was first published in 1928 and was a Newbery Honor recipient in 1929.

References

1928 American novels
American children's novels
Children's historical novels
Newbery Honor-winning works
Novels set in Massachusetts
Novels set in the 18th century
1928 children's books